Mike Rostampour (born December 20, 1991) is an Iranian-American professional basketball player for the Iranian national team.

Career
Rostampour played in the 2018 FIBA Americas League for San Salvador BC. He competed as a member of the Iran National team in the 2019 FIBA World Cup in China. Rostampour qualified for and competed in the 2020 Tokyo Olympics, where he represented Iran in the first two games against the Czech Republic and the United States.

References

1991 births
Living people
Iranian men's basketball players
Sportspeople from Minnesota
American people of Iranian descent
Sportspeople of Iranian descent
Power forwards (basketball)
2019 FIBA Basketball World Cup players
Basketball players at the 2020 Summer Olympics
Olympic basketball players of Iran